The Namibia cricket team is the team that represents the country of Namibia in international cricket matches. It is governed by Cricket Namibia, an associate member of the International Cricket Council since 1992 and became part of the High Performance Program in 2007. They took part in the 2003 Cricket World Cup in South Africa, though they lost all their games. They have played in each edition of the ICC Intercontinental Cup.

Cricket World Cup Record

By tournament

By team

2003 World Cup

The World Cup itself started on 10 February 2003 in Harare with Zimbabwe beating Namibia by 86 runs. Back in South Africa, they lost to Pakistan by 171 runs, before a 55 run defeat at the hands of England in which Namibia performed with some credit, Jan-Berrie Burger winning the man of the match award for his innings of 85 that almost helped Namibia pull off an unlikely upset. They then lost by 181 runs to India and a 256 run defeat against Australia, the eventual winners of the tournament, in what at the time was the biggest winning margin in One Day Internationals, since surpassed by an Indian 257 run win over Bermuda. The tournament finished with a 64 run loss to fellow qualifiers the Netherlands.

See also
Namibia national cricket team
Cricket in Namibia

References

Cricket in Namibia
Namibia in international cricket
History of the Cricket World Cup